Love Bug is an album by American country music singer George Jones. It was released in 1966 on the Musicor Records label.

Background
As Bob Allen points out in his book George Jones: The Life and Times of a Honky Tonk Legend, "During the next six years, with Musicor, George recorded more than over 280 songs – most of which were done in rushed, sloppily produced sessions – and help to establish for himself a somewhat unwelcome reputation as one of country music's most overrecorded artists."  Love Bug was one of several albums Musicor issued on Jones in 1966, with some of the same songs – such as "Things Have Gone To Pieces", "Take Me", and the title track – reappearing.  The album mostly features songs made famous by other artists, such as Dave Dudley, Roger Miller, and Merle Haggard.  It reached number seven on the country album chart.

Track listing
"Love Bug" (Wayne Kemp, Curtis Wayne) – 2:00
"Six Days on the Road" (Earl Green, Carl Montgomery) – 2:27
"The Bridge Washed Out" (Mel Melshee, Jimmy Louis, Sandra Smith, Slim Williamson) – 2:32
"Talk Back Trembling Lips" (John D. Loudermilk) – 2:29
"Don't Let Me Cross Over" (Penny Jay) – 2:29
"Blue Side of Lonesome" (Leon Payne) – 2:44
"Take Me" (Payne, George Jones) – 2:40
"Don't Be Angry" (Wade Jackson) – 2:43
"Unfaithful One" (J.M. Lyne) – 2:07
"King of the Road" (Roger Miller) – 2:29
"All My Friends Are Gonna Be Strangers" (Liz Anderson) – 2:22
"Things Have Gone to Pieces" (Payne) – 2:52

1966 albums
George Jones albums
Albums produced by Pappy Daily
Musicor Records albums